Bringing Up Bobby may refer to:
 Bringing Up Bobby (2009 film), a Christian direct-to-video comedy film
 Bringing Up Bobby (2011 film), a comedy-drama film